William McGilvray  (13 March 1895 – 8 May 1984) was an Australian rules footballer who played with Fitzroy in the Victorian Football League (VFL).		

Originally recruited from South Fremantle in Western Australia, McGilvray returned there in 1922, captaining the side.

Notes

External links 
		

1895 births
1984 deaths
Australian rules footballers from Western Australia
Fitzroy Football Club players
South Fremantle Football Club players